Brown County Bridge No. 36, also known as Hickory Hill Road Bridge and Wrightsman Bridge, is a historic Pratt through truss bridge located at Washington Township, Brown County, Indiana.  It was built by the Pan-American Bridge Company in 1908.  It consists of a 90 foot long span and 31 foot, 9 inch, span.  It was closed to vehicular traffic in November 1990, but remains open to foot traffic on the Ten O'Clock Treaty Line Trail.

It was listed on the National Register of Historic Places in 1993.

References

Road bridges on the National Register of Historic Places in Indiana
Bridges completed in 1908
Buildings and structures in Brown County, Indiana
National Register of Historic Places in Brown County, Indiana
1908 establishments in Indiana
Pratt truss bridges in the United States
Metal bridges in the United States